The following is a Mackerras pendulum for the 2017 Queensland state election.

"Safe" seats require a swing of over 10 per cent to change, "fairly safe" seats require a swing of between 6 and 10 per cent, while "marginal" seats require a swing of less than 6 per cent.

References

Pendulums for Queensland state elections